The 1947 Boston Braves season was the 77th season of the franchise. They finished in third place with an 86-68 win-loss record, 8 games behind the Brooklyn Dodgers.

Offseason
 Prior to 1947 season (exact date unknown)
Jack Daniels was acquired by the Braves from the Bloomingdale Troopers.
Carl Sawatski was acquired by the Braves from the Philadelphia Phillies.

Regular season 
On April 15, the Braves played against the Brooklyn Dodgers in Jackie Robinson's first game. Johnny Sain threw the first pitch against Robinson. Behind 3–2, Robinson scored the game-winning run against the Braves. The final score was 5–3 for Brooklyn.

Bob Elliott became the first third baseman in the history of the National League to win the MVP Award.

Season standings

Record vs. opponents

Roster

Player stats

Batting

Starters by position 
Note: Pos = Position; G = Games played; AB = At bats; H = Hits; Avg. = Batting average; HR = Home runs; RBI = Runs batted in

Other batters 
Note: G = Games played; AB = At bats; H = Hits; Avg. = Batting average; HR = Home runs; RBI = Runs batted in

Pitching

Starting pitchers 
Note: G = Games pitched; IP = Innings pitched; W = Wins; L = Losses; ERA = Earned run average; SO = Strikeouts

Other pitchers 
Note: G = Games pitched; IP = Innings pitched; W = Wins; L = Losses; ERA = Earned run average; SO = Strikeouts

Relief pitchers 
Note: G = Games pitched; W = Wins; L = Losses; SV = Saves; ERA = Earned run average; SO = Strikeouts

Awards and honors 
 Bob Elliott, National League MVP

Farm system 

LEAGUE CHAMPIONS: Milwaukee

Notes

References 

1947 Boston Braves season at Baseball Reference

Boston Braves seasons
Boston Braves
Boston Braves
1940s in Boston